The Bayelsa State Executive Council (also known as, the Cabinet of Bayelsa State) is the highest governmental body that plays important roles in the Government of Bayelsa State headed by the Governor of Bayelsa State. It consists of the Deputy Governor, the Secretary to the State Government, Chief of Staff, Commissioners who preside over ministerial departments, and the Governor's special aides.

Functions
The Executive Council exists to advise and direct the Governor. Their appointment as members of the Executive Council gives them the authority to execute power over their fields.

Current cabinet

The current Executive Council is serving under the Duoye Diri's administration.

Commissioners and Principal Officers

General Managers and Directors

Heads of Boards and Committees

References

Bayelsa
Politics of Bayelsa State